The Okeechobee Battlefield is a U.S. National Historic Landmark (designated as such on July 4, 1961). It is located four miles (6 km) southeast of Okeechobee, on US 441/98, near Taylor Creek. The Battle of Lake Okeechobee, one of the major conflicts of the Second Seminole War, was fought at the site.  Part of the battlefield is preserved as Okeechobee Battlefield State Historic Park.

Description and history
The Okeechobee Battlefield covers an estimated  of land on the east side of Taylor Creek. Much of the land is now agricultural, but portions of the battlefield have been developed, and it has been impacted by road construction. The principal feature of the battlefield is a low hummock, which provided the Seminoles with defensive cover in the engagement. North of this hummock, across what was originally open sawgrass, is a wooded area where Colonel Zachary Taylor made camp prior to the battle.

When the battlefield was listed as a National Historic Landmark in 1961, an area of  that was believed to include the "general area" of the battlefield was landmarked.  In the 1980s, the National Park Service commissioned more detailed studies, and performed some archaeological work in the area, to more precisely identify the battlefield area.  As a result, the landmarked area was decreased to above , most of which overlapped parts of the original designation. A marker was placed near the site in 1939, and a portion of the battlefield was purchased by the state of Florida in 2006.

A volunteer group sponsors annual reenactments of the Battle of Lake Okeechobee as a fundraising activity for the park.

See also
List of Florida state parks
List of National Historic Landmarks in Florida
National Register of Historic Places listings in Okeechobee County, Florida

References

External links
 Okeechobee Battlefield Historic State Park at Florida State Parks
 Friends of the Okeechobee Battlefield
 Okeechobee County listings at Florida's Office of Cultural and Historical Programs
 Most Endangered Places (2000 listing) - Okeechobee Battlefield at National Trust for Historic Preservation
 Conflict brews over historic site at The St. Petersburg Times Online
 State to Acquire Historic Okeechobee Battlefield at Florida Department of Environmental Protection

Geography of Okeechobee County, Florida
National Historic Landmarks in Florida
Battlefields of the wars between the United States and Native Americans
Seminole Wars
National Register of Historic Places in Okeechobee County, Florida
State parks of Florida